Drumchapel/Anniesland (Ward 14) is one of the 23 wards of Glasgow City Council. Since its creation in 2007 it has retained the same boundaries and returned four council members, using the single transferable vote system.

Boundaries
Located in the far north-west of Glasgow, the ward's western boundary is with West Dunbartonshire and its northern boundary with East Dunbartonshire. Despite its name, it contains only part of the Anniesland neighbourhood (the streets to the north of Anniesland Road, and to the north of Great Western Road, east of Anniesland Cross). It contains all of Drumchapel, Netherton, Temple, Old Drumchapel, Blairdardie and High Knightswood, and part of Knightswood (streets to the east of Great Western Road and Knightswood Road).

The ethnic makeup of the Drumchapel/Anniesland ward using the 2011 census population statistics was:

94.3% White Scottish / British / Irish / Other
3.3% Asian
1.8% Black (mainly African)
0.6% Mixed / Other Ethnic Group

Councillors

Election Results

2022 Election
2022 Glasgow City Council election

2017 Election
2017 Glasgow City Council election

2012 Election
2012 Glasgow City Council election

2010 by-election
On 6 May 2010, a by-election was held following the resignation of Labour councillor Stephen Purcell. The by-election was won by Labour's Christopher Hughes.

2009 by-election
On 4 June 2009, a by-election was held following the resignation of SNP MSP Bill Kidd as councillor. The by-election was won by Labour's Anne McTaggart.

2007 Election
2007 Glasgow City Council election

See also
Wards of Glasgow

References

External links
Listed Buildings in Drumchapel/Anniesland Ward, Glasgow City at British Listed Buildings

Wards of Glasgow
Drumchapel